Rubin Tyumen is an ice hockey team in Tyumen, Russia. They play in the VHL, the second level of Russian ice hockey.

History
The club's direct predecessor was a team called Vodnik Tyumen. It participated in lower levels of the Soviet hockey championship representing a Tyumen shipbuilding plant. In 1972, its place was taken by a team called Rubin ("Ruby") that began to represent a Tyumen automobile plant. It participated in the second group of the USSR championship "A". In 1995, it was reestablished as Gazovik Tyumen and changed its name back to Rubin Tyumen in 2010. In 2011, Rubin became the first VHL champions.

Achievements
VHL Bratina Cup: 2011
 IHL Championship (1): 1996

External links
Official site

Ice hockey teams in Russia
Sport in Tyumen
Ice hockey clubs established in 1995
1995 establishments in Russia
Ice hockey clubs established in 1972
1972 establishments in the Soviet Union
Kontinental Hockey League expansion teams
Tyumen